This is a list of presidents of Finland by their time in office. For a consecutive list, see list of presidents of Finland.

List

Gallery

See also 

 President of Finland
 List of presidents of Finland

Finland, Presidents
 
Presidents